James Cooper (26 February 1882 – 21 July 1949) was a Northern Ireland Unionist politician and solicitor.

He was educated at Portora Royal School and Wesley College, Dublin. He was the chairman of Fermanagh County Council from 1924 to 1928. He was elected to the House of Commons of Northern Ireland as an Ulster Unionist Party member for Fermanagh and Tyrone at the 1921 general election and was re-elected at the 1925 general election. He retired at the 1929 general election.

References

External link
 

1882 births
1949 deaths
Members of Fermanagh County Council
Members of the House of Commons of Northern Ireland 1921–1925
Members of the House of Commons of Northern Ireland 1925–1929
Members of the House of Commons of Northern Ireland for Fermanagh and Tyrone
Ulster Unionist Party members of the House of Commons of Northern Ireland
People educated at Wesley College, Dublin
People from County Fermanagh